The Onawa IOOF Opera House, also known as the Onawa Opera House, is a historic opera house located in Onawa, Iowa. It was completed in November, 1900, only to be heavily damaged in a fire a month later, on December 24, 1900.

It has been deemed historically significant as the building most strongly associated Onawa's "strong tradition of live-stage entertainment" from the late 1880s to the mid-1920s, involving three structures.

It was listed on the National Register of Historic Places in 1990.

References

Buildings and structures in Monona County, Iowa
Odd Fellows buildings in Iowa
Theatres completed in 1900
Romanesque Revival architecture in Iowa
Onawa, Iowa
Theatres on the National Register of Historic Places in Iowa
National Register of Historic Places in Monona County, Iowa
Opera houses on the National Register of Historic Places in Iowa
Opera houses in Iowa